Pentaphyllus testaceus is a species of darkling beetle in the family Tenebrionidae.

References

Further reading

External links

 

Tenebrionidae
Beetles described in 1792